Amina Helmi (6 October 1970) is an Argentine astronomer and professor at the Kapteyn Astronomical Institute at the University of Groningen in the Netherlands.

Education
Helmi was educated at Leiden University where she was awarded a PhD in 2000 with a thesis on the formation of the galactic halo, supervised by Tim de Zeeuw and Simon White.

Career and research
Since 2003 Helmi has been faculty member at the University of Groningen, and has been a full professor since 2014. Previously, she held postdoctoral positions at the University of La Plata in Argentina, the Max Planck Institute for Astrophysics in Germany, and Utrecht University in the Netherlands. 

Her research focuses investigates the evolution and dynamics of galaxies, in particular the Milky Way, using locations, velocities, ages, and chemical abundances of stars to understand the formation process of galaxies, known as galactic archaeology. She also studies the nature of dark matter. In her research, Helmi uses computer simulations as well as observational data from for example the Gaia space telescope.

Awards and honors
In 2019, Helmi was named one of the four winners of the Spinoza Prize. She was awarded membership of the Royal Netherlands Academy of Arts and Sciences in 2017.

She was awarded the Christiaan Huygensprize in 2004 and the Pastoor Schmeitsprize in 2010.

The Helmi stream is named after her and she was awarded the Suffrage Science award in 2019.

In 2021, Helmi won the Brouwer Award from the Division on Dynamical Astronomy of the American Astronomical Society.

References 

1970 births
Living people
20th-century Argentine astronomers
Argentine astrophysicists
Academic staff of the University of Groningen
Leiden University alumni
Members of the Royal Netherlands Academy of Arts and Sciences
Spinoza Prize winners
21st-century Argentine astronomers